DJ-Kicks (styled DJ-KiCKS on all cover artwork) is a series of DJ mix albums, mixed by various artists for the independent record label !K7 Records.

History
DJ-Kicks started out in 1993 as a compilation of electronic DJ -style mixes in the techno or house genres, with the then-novel twist of being targeted to a home listening audience. Soon afterwards, both the choice of compilers and the genres included were expanded: In addition to DJs, more and more producers (like Terranova), remixers (like Kruder & Dorfmeister), bands (like the Stereo MCs) and musicians (like Nicolette) compiled DJ-Kicks albums. The actual music began to vary wildly as well, ranging from Trüby Trio's downbeat jazz sound to Kemistry & Storm's aggressive drum and bass. Still, all contributions remain broadly within the electronic music genre.

The first DJ-Kicks release was C.J. Bolland's in 1995, and the series is still regularly expanded. As of October 2022, there are 78 releases in the series, with a release rate of about three new entries each year. 2016 and 2018 were particularly busy with five new mixes in each year, more than any other year so far. Some of the DJ-Kicks mixes are very popular and counted among the regular albums of the compiler, most notably the one by Kruder & Dorfmeister. The entries by Erlend Øye, Four Tet, James Holden, John Talabot, DJ Koze and Moodymann have also received particular acclaim. The DJ-Kicks series has been called "the most important DJ-mix series ever" by Mixmag. The 26th release was a special celebratory (and unmixed) "best of" compilation,  DJ-Kicks: The Exclusives. It consisted of original tracks by the DJs who had mixed the earlier albums in the series.

DJ-Kicks releases

Similar DJ series
 Back to Mine
 Late Night Tales
 Solid Steel
 Fabric Live

References

External links
 Official DJ-Kicks website
 !K7 Records website

DJ-Kicks albums
DJ mix album series
Compilation album series